Kulana is a village in Jhajjar District of Haryana, India. It is on the Jhajjar-Rewari road. As of 2017, the population was around 2,000 and the number of voters was 1,200.

It has at least one government school.
The postal code is 124108.

The Indian rower Dushyant Chauhan is from the village.

Adjacent villages
 Gurawra
 Amadalpur
 Machhroli
 Koka

References

Villages in Jhajjar district